"Digger" is the first episode of the second series of British television sitcom Bottom. It was first broadcast on 1 October 1992.

Synopsis 
After visiting a dating agency, Richie and his 'butler', Jives (Eddie) prepare to entertain an aristocratic woman, with Richie having sold his kidney on the black market to afford the caviar and the dinner jackets.

Plot 
The episode begins with the pair in Lily Linneker's (Lisa Maxwell) Love Bureau as they watch the dating videos the two made earlier. Eddie's video is typically boisterous and frisky, showing his backside to the camera and telling viewers to "come and get it". Richie's is characteristically nervous, which starts with a nervous "hello" and suggestion of "Lovely weather". At the end of the video, he suddenly enthusiastically lies, claiming to be the wealthy Duke of Kidderminster. The manager matches Richie with the third Viscountess of Moldavia, Lady Natasha Letitia Sarah Jane Wellesley Obstromsky Ponsonsky Smythe Smythe Smythe Smythe Smythe Oblomov Boblomov Dob (Helen Lederer). Meanwhile, Eddie turns down a date with Sarah Ferguson with great disgust, suggesting he would rather leave the agency office to maintain his "dignity".

Preparing on the night of Richie's date, Richie informs Eddie that he must be "Jives", his butler, for the evening and speak in a stereotypical accent. Richie reveals that he sold a kidney for £300 to pay for the evening, but is dismissive of the loss of a bodily organ, claiming that he will buy another kidney after marrying Natasha and selling off some of her property.

Whilst preparing food for the date, Richie mistakes bowls of caviar for unwashed dishes, and throws them away. Richie also notices that Eddie has not mashed the potatoes. Eddie explains that their potato masher is missing after being borrowed by a friend by the name of Harry "I'll Do Anything For Half A Pint" Grundy. Annoyed by this, Richie repeatedly slams Eddie's head into the saucepan containing the potatoes, thus mashing them with his head and calling it 'squashed potatoes'.

After a false alarm with a female charity collector (whom Eddie assaults, then relieves of her collecting tin adding it to a cupboard where they have collected many others), Richie's date arrives. Richie nudges Eddie to take her coat, Eddie staggers over to her with his face still covered in squashed potatoes. After removing her wrap and lowering his glasses, he ogles her cleavage, causing Richie to become enraged and beat him repeatedly with an umbrella. Natasha expresses her delight to Richie, that she has at last finally met some "genuine" aristocracy rather than another faker.

Richie then escorts Natasha to the "polo lounge" (in reality just their usual snug section of the flat with a decorated plate of Polo mints on the table). Richie goes on to state that this flat is simply his "London pomme de terre", and that his main castles are scattered all over the country as he never knows where he is going to be.

Returning to the kitchen for dinner, Richie repeatedly finds unintentional double entendres in what Eddie is saying while he serves the food. After several comments from Eddie to Natasha, Richie thinks Eddie is referring to sex and fights viciously with him behind a curtain in the kitchen. The first fight sees Eddie win, only for them to fight again so Richie ends up as the victor.

After dinner, a bedazzled Richie asks Natasha to marry him. She eagerly accepts, but Richie does not hear her explanation – that she needs to marry quickly or be impoverished forever. An increasingly excited Richie asks her if she believes in sex before marriage. After some convincing, he finally accepts that he is indeed to lose his virginity that night.

While Richie prepares in his bedroom, a suspicious Eddie wonders why Natasha really wants to marry Richie. Natasha reveals that her family has lost their entire fortune in a Moldavian civil war and that she must marry the "first stupidly wealthy aristocrat" she can find, otherwise her entire family shall remain penniless, and she despises poor people. Not caring for Richie's feelings, Eddie makes a pass at her. After tossing some loose change over his shoulder, he claims he has a "few quid laying about the place" and that if it is stupidity she is looking for, then "There's nobody more stupid then the Hitlers!" – after which he smashes a dinner plate on his forehead. Natasha rejects Eddie's advances but goes on to tell Eddie, "If anything should happen to Richie, I will be onto you and up your trouser leg like a whippet!" After Eddie faints, she goes to join Richie in the bedroom.

After he excites himself by reading More Joy of Sex, Richie's big moment finally arrives. Natasha tells Richie to unzip the back of her dress, which Richie has some difficulty with as his hands suddenly stop working. Natasha strips before him and climbs into his bed. However, before he can join her, Richie appears to suffer a heart attack, collapsing with a "Just typical..." expression on his face.

Richie awakens in an ambulance with Eddie, who tells Richie that he passed out because the cheap surgeon who removed his kidney reattached his urinary system incorrectly and caused it to backfire. Eddie also accidentally lets slip how he and Natasha passed the five-hour wait for the emergency services, but Eddie tries to console Richie by saying she was "crap" in bed. The episode ends with an enraged Richie zapping Eddie on the head with a heart defibrillator.

Production
On the Bottom Fluff out-takes video, it is shown that the entire first scene of this episode, with Richie and Eddie filling out their dating forms, and featuring an uncredited appearance by Nadia Sawalha, was edited out for timing reasons. Most of the removed dialogue would later be recycled to appear in the first Bottom Live stage show, and in some scenes in the following series.

Continuity and production errors
 Eddie is acting as a butler whilst Richie and his new girlfriend are having a meal. After Eddie says "Pork?" to her, Richie stands up and shouts "Eddie, how dare you!?". A full shot of the table with all three of the characters is seen, when he continues by saying "She is my fiancée!". In the background, there is a picture of Elvis Presley, in which the reflection of a boom mic is seen in the photo.
 Richie and Eddie are finding a way to mash potatoes. Richie shoves Eddie's head repeatedly into the pan to mash the potatoes. As his head enters the pan, the pan bends, showing that the pan is made from cardboard, soft plastic, or some other flexible material.

References

External links

Bottom (TV series)
1992 British television episodes